Grodkowska Plain is a micro-region covering the south-eastern part of the Wroclaw Plain in Poland, between the river Oława, Oder and Neisse Kłodzka; in the region there are upland moraine, eskers, fertile soil, and agriculture. The cities in the area are: Brzeg, Grodkow, Lewin Brzeski, and  Strzelin Elm.

Geography of Opole Voivodeship
Brzeg County